Agabus disintegratus, the disintegrated diving beetle, is a species of predaceous diving beetle in the family Dytiscidae occurring in North America.

References

Further reading

External links

 

disintegratus
Articles created by Qbugbot
Beetles described in 1873